Gustavo Martínez may refer to:

Gustavo Martínez (cyclist), who competed at the 1952 Summer Olympics
Gustavo Martínez (sailor), who competed at the 2000 & 2004 Summer Olympics